Randy Mitton (born September 22, 1950) is a Canadian retired National Hockey League linesman. His career started in 1972 and ended in 2004. During his career, Mitton officiated one Stanley Cup final, 2,109 regular season games, 156 playoff games, the 1987 Canada Cup, and two All-Star games.

References

External links
 The National Hockey League Official Guide & Record Book/1993-94

1950 births
Living people
Ice hockey people from New Brunswick
National Hockey League officials
Sportspeople from Fredericton